Mount Abu is a hill station in the Aravalli Range in Sirohi district of the state of Rajasthan in western India.The mountain forms a rocky plateau 22 km long by 9 km wide. It is referred to as 'an oasis in the desert' as its heights are home to rivers, lakes, waterfalls and evergreen forests. The nearest train station is Abu Road railway station 28 km away.

History
The ancient name of Mount Abu is Arbuda. In the Puranas, the region has been referred to as Arbudaranya ("forest of Arbuda") and 'Abu' is a diminutive of this ancient name. It is believed that sage Vashistha retired to the southern spur at Mount Abu following his differences with sage Vishvamitra. There is another history story according to which a serpent named "Arbuda" saved the life of Nandi (Lord Shiva's bull). The incident happened on the mountain that is currently known as Mount Abu and so the mountain is named "Arbudaranya" after that incident which gradually became Abu.

According to a legend, the sage Vashistha performed a yajna at the peak of Mount Abu, to seek from the gods a provision for the defense of righteousness on earth. In answer to his prayer, a youth arose from the Agnikunda (fire-altar) — the first Agnivansha. Achalgarh Fort is one of more attractive place which was built by Parmar kings. The Dilwara was temple built by the mahipala Solanki (Chalukya).

The conquest of Mount Abu in 1311 CE by Rao Lumba of the Deora-Chauhan dynasty brought to an end the reign of the Parmars and marked the decline of Mount Abu. He shifted the capital city to Chandravati in the plains. After the destruction of Chandravati in 1405, Rao Shasmal made Sirohi his headquarters. Later it was leased by the British government from the then Maharaja of Sirohi for use as the headquarters.

The Arbuda Mountains region is said to be original abode of the famous gurus like Atri and Vashishtha. The association of the Gurus with the mountain is noticed in many inscriptions and epigraphs including Tilakamanjari of Dhanpala. According to one theory, this Gurdhara or land of the gurus got corrupted with time and became Gurjara.

A municipality was established at Abu in 1864; it had six members nominated by the Agent to the Governor General (AGG).

Tourism

It has been a popular retreat from the heat of Rajasthan and neighboring Gujarat for centuries.

The mountain is home to several Hindu temples, including the Adhar Devi Temple (also known as Arbuda Devi Temple), carved out of the solid rock; the Shri Raghunathji Temple; and a shrine and temple to Dattatreya built atop the Guru Shikhar peak; and the Achaleshwar Mahadev Temple (1412).

The Achalgarh Fort, built in the 14th century by Kumbha of Mewar, is nearby and at its center is the popular visitor attraction of the Nakki Lake. The Toad Rock is on a hill near the lake. Close to the fort is the Achaleshwar Mahadev Temple, a popular Shiva temple. Also, Achal Fort Jain Temple, Kantinath Jain Temple (1513) is equally famous.

The Durga Ambika Mata Temple lies in a cleft of rock in Jagat, just outside Mount Abu town.

The mountain is also the home to a number of Jain temples including Dilwara Temples, a complex of temples carved out of white marble. The Dilwara Temples or Delvada Temples are located about 2½ kilometers from the Mount Abu town. These Jain temples were built by Vimal Shah and designed by Vastupala, Jain ministers of Dholka, between the 11th and 16th centuries and are famous for their use of white marble and intricate marble carvings. They are a pilgrimage place of the Jains, and a popular general tourist attraction. The temples have an opulent entranceway, the simplicity in architecture reflecting Jain values like honesty and frugality. Minutely-carved ornamental detail covers the ceilings, doorways, pillars, and panels.
The temple complex is in the midst of a range of forested hills. There are five temples in all, each with its own unique identity. All five temples are enclosed within a single high walled compound. The group is named after the small village of Dilwara or Delvara in which they are located. The five temples are:
Vimal Vasahi, dedicated to the first Jain Tirthankara, Shri Rishabhadev.
Luna Vasahi, dedicated to the 22nd Jain Tirthankara, Shri Neminatha.
Pittalhar, dedicated to the first Jain Tirthankar, Shri Rishabhadev.
Parshvanath, dedicated to the 23rd Jain Tirthankara, Shri Parshvanatha.
Mahavir Swami, dedicated to the last Jain Tirthankara, Shri Mahaviraswami.

Among all the five legendary marble temples of Dilwara, the most famous of those are the Vimal Vasahi and the Luna Vasahi temples.

In Mount Abu, the faith community of Brahma Kumaris has its spiritual headquarters, which are represented by its own account in 110 countries. Every year about 2.5 million visitors are supposed to visit the sprawling campus of that spiritual movement. The Brahma Kumaris ashram has a museum that displays the knowledge that Lord Shiva gave to the Prajapita Brahma. The 50-acre land also provides ample space for meditation and spiritual learning as well as to connect yourself to the stunning, undisturbed natural surroundings.

The Mount Abu Wildlife Sanctuary was established in 1960 and covers 290 km² of the mountain. The sanctuary encircles the town, and sloth bears from the sanctuary have habitually been seen inside the city throughout the year foraging on hotel waste in open rubbish bins.

In literature
Arbuda Mountains is a mountain range described in the epic Mahabharata. It is identified to be Mount Abu. This mountain is mentioned in the travels of Arjuna during his twelve-year pilgrimage.

Letitia Elizabeth Landon's poem Hindoo Temples on the Mountain-Lake of Aboo, published in Fisher's Drawing Room Scrap Book, 1839, is a reflection on this mountain fastness.

Climate
The average annual precipitation of Mount Abu is 1554 mm.

Monsoon
Due to its relief and geographical conditions, it rains in Mount Abu during the monsoons. During the rainy season, the temperature falls. Normal summer clothing works. It is wise to carry an umbrella to avoid being caught in the rain.

Winter
Winters are cool in Mount Abu, with the mercury hovering around 13 °C to 22 °C. Nights are chilly, and the average night temperature is around 3 to 12 °C. The temperature has dipped to as low as −7 °C. Heavy winter clothing is preferable. In the daytime, light pullovers are sufficient.

Culture
Winter Festival at Mount Abu

Demographics
According to the 2011 Census of India, Mount Abu has a population of 22,943. out of which 54.7% are males and 45.3% are females. It has an average literacy rate of 81.15%, higher than the national average of 74.04%: male literacy is 90.12%, and female literacy is 70.23%. In Mount Abu, 12.34% of the population is under 6 years of age.

89.31% of people are Hindu, 7.69% are Muslim while 1.45% are Christian.

Gallery

References

Sources

External links

 Shri Achaleshwar Mahadev Mandir
 Mount Abu Coordinates
 Mount Abu Population
 Abu Winter Festival
 Mount Abu Virtual Tour 360
 Mount Abu Panorama
 

 
Articles containing potentially dated statements from 2011
All articles containing potentially dated statements
Hill stations in Rajasthan
Cities and towns in Sirohi district
Hindu holy cities
Abu
Tourism in Rajasthan
Aravalli Range
Jain pilgrimage sites
Tourist attractions in Sirohi district